Carrie Ann Lucas (November 18, 1971 – February 24, 2019) was a lawyer, disability rights advocate, and activist in the United States. She founded Disabled Parents Rights, an organization to fight discrimination against parents with disabilities. In addition to fighting for parents' rights in Colorado and nationally, she also worked to combat "right to die" legislation. With others from ADAPT, she was arrested after a 58-hour sit-in in the office of Colorado Senator Cory Gardner in 2017.

Biography
Carrie Ann Lucas was an athlete studying sports medicine when after graduating from Whitworth College, she was diagnosed with a neuromuscular disease. She was an ordained minister, graduating from the Iliff School of Theology, and also worked as a teacher while living in Saipan. As her symptoms progressed, she took a semester off from law school to study Braille and sign language, eventually graduating 15th in her class at the University of Denver Law School.

While working for the Colorado Cross-Disability Coalition, she was lead plaintiff for a class action suit against Kmart, one of the largest accessibility class action settlements to date.  In 2004, Lucas founded the Center for the Rights of Parents with Disabilities. She was an advocate in the Disability Rights Movement with organizations such as ADAPT, Not Dead Yet, and the National Council on Disability for many years.  She ran for public office in Windsor, Colorado in 2017.

Hard of hearing and legally blind, breathing through a ventilator and using a power wheelchair, she raised four adopted children with developmental and physical disabilities.

In February 2019, at the age of 47, Lucas suffered cardiac arrest and died from complications from an ensuing infection. Her friends and family claimed Lucas' death was hastened by her insurance company's denial of necessary medication.

Lucas was openly lesbian.

References/Notes and references

External links
 Disability Pride, blog of Carrie Ann Lucas. 
 Disabled Parents Rights

21st-century American lawyers
1971 births
2019 deaths
Activists from Colorado
American people with disabilities
Colorado lawyers
American disability rights activists
People from Windsor, Colorado
21st-century American women lawyers
LGBT people from Colorado
People from Twentynine Palms, California
Activists from California
LGBT people from California
Whitworth University alumni
University of Denver alumni
20th-century American lawyers
20th-century American women lawyers
21st-century LGBT people